Ogooué-Létili is a department of Haut-Ogooué Province in Gabon. It had a population of 2,791 in 2013.

References 

Departments of Gabon